Jessica 'Jess' Edwards (born 20 September 1989) is an Australian rules footballer playing for  in the AFL Women's (AFLW).

Early Life
Edwards was raised in South Australia. Edwards began playing Ladies' Gaelic football as a junior. In 2016 Edwards switched codes and played with the Wandsworth Demons in AFL London before moving to Australia in 2017. Edwards moved to Adelaide and captained North Adelaide Football Club women's team in the SAWFL in 2017. In 2018 Edwards captained the Adelaide University to the SAWFL Grand Final and captained Collingwood in the VFL Women's competition (VFLW) in 2018. Edwards was drafted by Carlton with the 42nd pick overall in the 2018 AFLW draft.

AFLW Career
Edwards debuted in the opening round of the 2019 season and played in the 2019 AFL Women's Grand Final.

References

External links 

Living people
1989 births
Australian rules footballers from Victoria (Australia)
Carlton Football Club (AFLW) players